Nuestro Destino Estaba Escrito (Eng.: Our Destiny Was Written) is a studio album released by Regional Mexican band Intocable. This album became their third number-one set on the Billboard Top Latin Albums. It was released with two formats, CD and CD/DVD, and in 2007 a new edition retitled Nuestro Destino Estaba Escrito: Historia y Tradición. This release received a nomination for a Grammy Award for Best Mexican/Mexican-American Album.

Track listing
The track listing from Billboard.com

CD and CD/DVD

Historia y Tradición edition
This information from Allmusic.

Credits
The information form Allmusic.
René Martínez — Producer, group member
Ricky Muñoz — Producer, group member
Luis Padilla — Arranger, vocals
Gilbert Velasquez — Recording
Jay Frigoletto — Mastering
Gabriel Wallach — Mastering
Jack Saenz — Mixing
Intocable — Arranger
Johnny Lee Rosas — Arranger
Silvestre Rodríguez — Group member
José Angel González — Group member
José Juan Hernández — Group member
José Ángel Farías — Group member
Félix G. Salinas — Group member
Daniel Sánchez — Group member
Sergio Serna — Group member
Nelsón González — Graphic design, Art direction

Chart performance

Sales and certifications

References

2003 albums
Intocable albums